The German Open is an annual table tennis tournament in Germany, run by the International Table Tennis Federation (ITTF). It is currently part of the ITTF World Tour.

History

The tournament was first held in 1925, and has featured on the ITTF World Tour's schedule in 1999, and then every year since 2001.

China's Ma Long holds the record for most men's singles tournament wins, with five, while in the women's singles event, Mária Mednyánszky, Astrid Krebsbach, Trude Pritzi, Agnes Simon and Maria Alexandru all share the record with three wins each. Since the tournament became part of the ITTF World Tour in 1999, Chen Meng is the only player wins the women's singles event more than once.

In August 2016, it was announced by the ITTF that Magdeburg has been chosen as one of six cities to host a "World Tour Platinum" event in 2017. These events will replace the Super Series as the top tier of the ITTF World Tour. The German Table Tennis Association has confirmed that the "German Open" name will continue to be used.

Champions

Individual Events

1925–1988

1990–2018

2019–present

Team Events

See also
European Table Tennis Union

References

External links
International Table Tennis Federation
German Table Tennis Association

ITTF World Tour
Table tennis competitions
Table tennis competitions in Germany
Annual sporting events in Germany
Recurring sporting events established in 1925